Friends is a 1988 Japanese-Swedish drama film directed by Kjell-Åke Andersson. Peter Mokrosinski won the award for Best Cinematography at the 24th Guldbagge Awards.

Cast
 Dennis Christopher as John
 Sven Wollter as Zeb
 Stellan Skarsgård as Matt
 Lena Olin as Sue
 Anita Wall as Jennifer
 Aino Taube as Matilda
 Helena Bergström as Bonnie
 Edita Brychta as Sally
 Craig Richard Nelson as The Client

References

External links
 
 

1988 films
1988 drama films
Japanese drama films
Swedish drama films
English-language Japanese films
English-language Swedish films
Films directed by Kjell-Åke Andersson
Swedish films based on plays
1980s English-language films
1980s Japanese films
1980s Swedish films